Naudero, also spelled Naundero, Nodero is a town and union council of Ratodero Taluka in the Larkana District, Sindh, Pakistan. The union council also includes the village of Garhi Khuda Bakhsh. It lies to the northwest of the district capital Larkana, connected by road. Irrigated by canals, the area is noted for its rice production. A sugar mill has been constructed in the area, funded by the Chinese. Asif Zardari held a press conference in the town two days after Benazir Bhutto's murder, accusing the Pakistan Muslim League (Q) party leadership of people responsible for her murder.
Her grave and that of her father's Zulfiqar Ali Bhutto are located in Naudero.

References

Populated places in Larkana District